Le Canadien was a French language newspaper published in Lower Canada from November 22, 1806 to March 14, 1810. Its motto was: "Nos institutions, notre langue et nos droits" (Our institutions, our language, our rights). It was released every Saturday and the yearly subscription was of 10 chelins or shillings.

History 
The newspaper was founded in Quebec City by lawyer Pierre-Stanislas Bédard and associates François Blanchet, Jean-Antoine Panet, Jean-Thomas Taschereau and Joseph Le Vasseur Borgia. All were members of the Parliament of Lower Canada at the time. The editor was Jean-Antoine Bouthillier. The newspaper quickly became the voice of the Parti canadien in their battle against the English party and the government of governor James Craig.

On March 17, 1810, the press and the papers of the editorial office on rue Saint-François were seized by the government. The printer Charles Lefrançois was imprisoned and a patrol searched the city for conspirators. The Quebec Mercury had previously insinuated that the French Canadians and the Americans were plotting against England. Two days later, no conspirators had been found.  Bédard, Blanchet and Taschereau were arrested and also jailed.

The prisoners were refused habeas corpus. While in prison, Bédard was nominated as member of parliament in the Surrey riding and elected at the general election of March 27, 1810. In 1811, MP Louis-Joseph Papineau asked Governor Craig to clear Bédard of all charges. Governor Craig refused. Bédard  was finally ordered out of prison at the end of the Legislative Assembly's session. He was never tried.

The newspaper published again a few times, with intermissions. Le Canadien disappeared on February 11, 1893, then owned by Joseph-Israël Tarte.

See also
History of Canadian newspapers
La Minerve
List of Quebec media
Patriote movement
History of Quebec
Timeline of Quebec history
List of newspapers in Canada

References

External links
 Chronologie de l'histoire du Québec (in French)

Defunct newspapers published in Quebec
French-language newspapers published in Quebec
Newspapers published in Quebec City
Patriote movement
Publications established in 1806
Publications disestablished in 1810
1806 establishments in Lower Canada
1810 disestablishments in Lower Canada